Vaiva is a Lithuanian female given name of Baltic origin. It is a shortening of vaivorykštė (English rainbow). A rainbow was considered one of the manifestations of the Pagan destiny goddess Laima. Vaiva's father, according to Baltic mythology, is Perkūnas. The name was popularised by V.Krėvė-Mickevičius tale "Perkūnas, Vaiva ir Straublys" written in 1922.

Notable people with the name include:
 , Lithuanian theater and cinema actress

References 

Lithuanian feminine given names